Pumpkin Reports is a Spanish-Malaysian-Italian computer animated science fiction comedy television series. It was produced by Motion Pictures and was broadcast from October 31, 2015, to April 23, 2016, on Nickelodeon, Clan, and Rai Gulp. 52 episodes were produced.

Plot
Loom and Ran are Kemiies who were sent to the Earth in order to send back reports and plan the invasion. Max Green's relatively normal life changes after he discovers that. Since his parents will not believe him, Max is left to stop the Kemiies' earth-dominating plots. Max receives help from his friends, including Violet – Max's friendly nemesis since kindergarten, Pixel – the town's nerd and most convinced alien believer, and Simon Sillicon – a genius scientist fallen into disgrace. Most of Loom's and Ran's plans are failed causing the invasion to be put off. All that comes to change later Loom's soulmate, who is a human. With his help the invasion is getting closer.

Characters

Loom Prxbtlyp 
Loom Prxbtlyp, also referred to as her civilian name, Teresa Green (voiced by Onalea Gilbertson) is, upon first inspection, a polite, neatly-dressed, well-behaved pre-teen girl who was adopted by the Greens family. She's a straight-A student and respects her elders. But in actuality she is a Kemii dedicated to taking over the earth and enslaving its inhabitants, as her job is to send nightly reports describing the human race to the orbiting Kemii to speed up the impending invasion and later to start the invasion. She has trouble grasping the subtleties of human nature, and tends to see humans as illogical and like an ant farm. Loom has a very sensitive side and sometimes becomes more human than a Kemii. Later her soulmate came in the series and together they plan the invasion and their ruling.

Loom chose her disguise of a cute 12-year-old Teresa based on characters she saw on a movie billboard from across the Greens' house, and named his brother Goliath off of a dog's ID tag.

Ran Strb 
Ran Strb, also referred to as his civilian name, Goliath Green (voiced by Pietro Ubaldi) is a 380-year-old Kemii who was nearing retirement when he got his assignment and thought the job would be a drag. Ran doesn't speak in any Earth languages, and instead speaks only the Kemii language. His body is heavily clothed and he has a mop of pumpkin-orange hair, so only a portion of his face is ever shown. He also has a long vegetal tail with a mind of its own, and can extend a slimy psedupodal green stalk-body on which he can elevate his kindergarten-sized self to an intimidating 20-feet high.

Victor Green 
Victor Green (voiced by H.D. Quinn) is a loving, if somewhat distracted, father and a doting husband. He has the ambition of doing great things for his family. He and his son, Max share a positive outlook on life, and a slight tendency to be unrealistically optimistic. He is a mid-level executive at Cucurtown's biggest business, Cutlery Land.

Laura Green 
Laura Green (voiced by Lindsay Sheppard) is Max's mother, and she loves her children. She also loves gardening. Her primo gourd-growth is the first reason her backyard was chosen by Loom as the landing site for the Kemii Advance Team, and her prize-winning pumpkin is alien headquarters. Laura is a happy homemaker with a college degree in Botany, but beyond her garden and family she has a big ambition; to compete someday on the popular weekly TV game show Who Knows What with her large, and growing expertise in koalas and Australian Rules Football.

Max Green 
Max Green (voiced by Shannon Conley) is an energetic, bossy, underhand 11-year-old. He is good at sports, talented in music and academics, and was popular at school until Loom and Ran, his adoptive "siblings" showed up and stole the show. His goal is to make people believe his alien siblings theory for attempting to use his home as a home base for stealing Earth, and to stop their daily reports about the human race to their home planet, Kemii.

Pixel Sillicon
Pixel Sillicon is a fool 11‐year‐old who loves aliens. His father is a dedicated UFOlogist, which accounts for Pixel's interest, but not for the depth of his ardor. Pixel believes he was abducted by aliens and he sincerely hopes to be abducted again one day – so he leaves his bedroom window open at night and has an arrow of lights on the roof pointing to his room.

Pixel's easy credulity makes him a less-than-perfect ally for Max's campaign to convince the townspeople. He's loyal to his good friend Max, not least because Max actually lives with two aliens. Despite his admiration of Max and acknowledgment of Max as the anti-invasion Team Leader, Pixel is romantically attracted to Loom, and believed he and she could rule earth between them as benevolent King and Queen before seeing her soulmate and their plans of ruling their kingdom.

Dylan Jones provides his voice.

Simon Sillicon
Pixel's father, Simon Sillicon, abandoned his foundational computer work (which resulted in a famous Valley in California being named after him) to devote his genius to discovering the aliens he has been convinced have been walking among us for 30 years.

The real scientific community shunned Simon years ago, so for three decades Simon has worked, inventing hitech gleaming gadgets and computer programs to fight the alien onslaught he's certain is coming. Simon is so tech-focused, so intent upon his devices and computer algorithms, the issue of being bossed‐around by two kids doesn’t come up. He's glad to be of service in any plan that Max or Violet contrive.

Simon has a mysterious past. There are files which are getting him involved in a big scandal.

He is voiced by Matt Ban.

Violet Violet
Violet Violet is a smart, strong-willed, trend-bucking 11-year-old girl with a BIG fashion sense and a blog describing how she’d like to improve the world – its music, aesthetics, and especially its rigid, closed-minded people; like the teachers who won’t let her wear a swan hat to class.

She wears violet clothing, dyes her hair violet, and is looking for a violet pet. To her, the color represents the repudiation of conformity. Her being strong-willed is a problem, because Max is strong-willed too. These two, competitors in school and now in saving the planet, seldom see eye-to-eye. Each one wants to run their alien-busting outfit and each chafes at anything sounding like "orders" coming from the other.

She is voiced by Stephanie Pam Roberts.

Episodes

Broadcast
In the United States, Pumpkin Reports debuted alongside the launch of Primo TV on January 16, 2017.

References

External links
 
 http://motionpic.com/catalogue/pumpkin-reports/

2010s animated television series
2010s children's television series
Italian children's animated adventure television series
Italian children's animated comic science fiction television series
Malaysian children's animated adventure television series
Malaysian children's animated comic science fiction television series
Spanish children's animated adventure television series
Spanish children's animated comic science fiction television series
Animated television series about children